A transistor is a semiconductor device used to amplify and switch electronic signals and electrical power.

Transistor may also refer to:

Music
 Transistor (311 album), 1997
 "Transistor" (song), the title track by the band 311 from the album Transistor
 Transistor (TNT album)
 "Transistor," a song by Kraftwerk from the 1975 album Radio-Activity
 Twisted Transistor, a song written and recorded by the American band Korn
 Transister, band

Other uses
 Transistor (video game), a 2014 video game by Supergiant Games

See also
 Transistor radio, a small portable radio receiver using transistor-based circuitry